Gyracanthides is an extinct genus of acanthodian gnathostome, known from Devonian to Early Carboniferous.

Description 
A recent study suggested that Gyracanthides is closely related to chondrichthyans (as currently delimited), and that acanthodians are paraphyletic.

References

Acanthodii genera
Carboniferous acanthodians